Synaphea media is a shrub endemic to Western Australia.

It blooms August and October producing yellow flowers.

It is found along the south coast in the Great Southern and Goldfields-Esperance regions of Western Australia where it grows in sandy soils over granite.

References

Eudicots of Western Australia
media
Endemic flora of Western Australia
Plants described in 1995